Here I Go Again is the title of a number-one R&B single by singer Glenn Jones, which was released November 26, 1991. The hit song spent one week at number-one on the Billboard R&B chart and was his most successful song on the chart.

"Here I Go Again"- The music video was directed by Pierluca DeCarlo, produced by Jeff Beasley at Spellbound Pictures.

Charts

Weekly charts

Year-end charts

See also
List of number-one R&B singles of 1992 (U.S.)

References

1992 singles
Glenn Jones songs
1992 songs
Song articles with missing songwriters